The V-boats were a group of nine United States Navy submarines built between World War I and World War II from 1921 to 1934 under authorization as the "fleet boat" program.

The term "V-boats" as used includes five separate classes of submarines: large, fast fleet submarines (V-1 through V-3), large long-range submarines (the minelayer V-4 and two submarine cruisers V-5 and V-6) and three medium-sized submarines (V-7 through V-9).

The successful fleet submarines of World War II ( through ) were descended from the last three, especially V-7, though somewhat larger with pure diesel-electric propulsion systems.

All served in World War II, six of them on war patrols in the central Pacific. Argonaut was lost to enemy action.

Background
In the early 1910s, only 12 years after  inaugurated the Navy's undersea force, naval strategists had already begun to wish for submarines that could operate in closer collaboration with the surface fleet than the Navy's existing classes, which had been designed primarily for coastal defense.

In the summer of 1913, Electric Boat's chief naval architect, former naval constructor Lawrence Y. Spear, proposed two preliminary fleet-boat designs for consideration in the Navy's 1914 program. In the ensuing authorization of eight submarines, Congress specified that one should "be of a seagoing type to have a surface speed of not less than twenty knots". This first fleet boat, laid down in June 1916, was named USS Schley after Spanish–American War hero Winfield Scott Schley. To achieve the required surface speed, two tandem  diesel engines on each shaft drove twin screws, and a separate diesel generator was provided for charging batteries. As the engines were clutched together,  perfectly synchronizing operation of the engines was impossible.

In 1916, well before the T class debacle transpired, Congress authorized 58 coastal submarines and nine additional "fleet" boats. Three of the larger  coastal boats eventually became competing prototypes for the long-lived, 51-member S class. The nine "fleet boats" became the "V-boats", built between 1921 and 1934, and in fact, they were the only U.S. submarines produced in that period. Although V-4, V-5, and V-6 were the largest US non-nuclear submarines ever built, only V-1 through V-3 were designed to reach a speed of 21 knots.

V-1 through V-3—the Barracudas
The first three V-boats were funded in fiscal year 1919, laid down at the Portsmouth Navy Yard in October and November 1921, and commissioned somewhat less than a year apart between 1924 and 1926. Significantly, V-1, V-2, and V-3 were the only members of the class designed to satisfy the Navy's original "fleet boat" requirement for high surface speed. The propulsion plant was divided between two separate engine rooms—forward and aft of the control room—with two  main-propulsion direct-drive diesels aft, and two independent  diesel generators forward. The latter were primarily for charging batteries, but to reach maximum surface speed, they could augment the mechanically coupled main-propulsion engines by driving the  electric motors in parallel. This partial diesel-electric propulsion system foreshadowed the later successful all-diesel-electric submarines, although nearly 10 years of development were required before it was reliable. The three boats were partially double-hulled and fitted forward with buoyancy tanks inside a bulbous bow for better surface sea-keeping. They were armed with six 21-inch (533 mm) torpedo tubes, four forward and two aft with 12 torpedoes, plus a 5-inch (127 mm)/51 caliber deck gun.

Unfortunately, the first three V-boats had poor operational performance. As built, they were somewhat too heavy forward, which made them poor sea boats, even after replacing the original deck guns with smaller 3-inch (76 mm)/50 caliber models to save weight in 1928. Moreover, both the main propulsion diesel engines and their original electric motors were notoriously unreliable, and full-power availability was rare. Renamed Barracuda, Bass, and Bonita in 1931, they were decommissioned in 1937, and only the imminence of World War II provided a reprieve, in preparation for which they were recommissioned in September 1940. Just before Pearl Harbor, the three boats were transferred to Coco Solo, Panama Canal Zone, and each made a number of defensive war patrols (without seeing any action) off the approaches to the Panama Canal.

All three boats were overhauled in Philadelphia, Pennsylvania, in late 1942 and early 1943, and converted to cargo submarines by removing both torpedo tubes and main engines, thereby leaving them solely dependent on their diesel generators for propulsion. Because this rendered the boats severely underpowered, they apparently never served operationally in their cargo-carrying role, but instead were relegated to training duties at New London until just before the end of the war in 1945. After decommissioning, Barracuda and Bonita were scrapped, and Bass was scuttled as a sonar target near Block Island, Rhode Island.

V-4—Argonaut
Displacing , submerged, V-4—later —was both the largest submarine the Navy ever built before the advent of nuclear power and the only U.S. submarine specifically designed as a minelayer. Her configuration, and that of the following V-5 and V-6, resulted from an evolving strategic concept that increasingly emphasized the possibility of a naval war with Japan in the far western Pacific. This factor, and the implications of the 1922 Washington Naval Treaty, suggested the need for long-range submarine "cruisers", or "strategic scouts", as well as long-range minelayers, for which long endurance, not high speed, was most important. The design was possibly influenced by the German "U-cruisers" of the Type U-139 and Type U-151 U-boat classes, although V-4, V-5, and V-6 were all larger than these. Two 6-inch (152 mm)/53 caliber deck guns were equipped, the largest deck guns ever on a US submarine.

The V-4 was a significant boat in that it was the first submarine in the USN to incorporate welding in its construction. All submarines prior to V-4 were of all-riveted construction. Engineers at Portsmouth Navy Yard, led by Navy welding expert James W. Owens, experimented with welding for the first time during her construction. Welding was used in non-critical areas such as the superstructure, piping brackets, and support framing. The rest of the V-4s construction, including the pressure hull, was riveted or bolted. The rest of the V-class, to some extent, incorporated welding into their construction.http://pigboats.com/subs/v-boats2.html 

An over-large, under-powered, and one-of-a-kind submarine, Argonaut was never particularly successful, but stayed in commission all through the 1930s. Despite having never laid a mine in anger, her mine-laying gear was stripped out at this time to prepare for conversion to a troop-carrying submarine. Then, at Pearl Harbor, the conversion was completed. In that guise, and accompanied by Nautilus, she participated in the US Marine assault on Japanese-held Makin Atoll by Carlson's Raiders in August 1942. In transferring to Brisbane, Australia, late that year, Argonaut was diverted to a war patrol near Bougainville in the northern Solomon Islands, and was lost with all hands on 10 January 1943 after attacking a heavily defended Japanese convoy.

V-5 and V-6—Narwhal and Nautilus
In their overall appearance and dimensions, V-5, later Narwhal and V-6, later Nautilus were similar to Argonaut and constituted "submarine cruiser" counterparts at least partially inspired by German success with long-range submarine commerce raiders of the Type U-139 and Type U-151 U-boat classes in World War I. Endurance, sea-keeping, increased torpedo capacity, and large deck guns were emphasized at the cost of high speed; and originally, a small scouting seaplane was to be carried in a water-tight hangar abaft the conning tower. The Navy had experimented with seaplanes on submarines with a prototype hangar installation on  during the mid-1920s. However, the resulting increase in scouting capability was significantly offset by several additional dangers to the host submarine, and the initiative was dropped.

They displayed prominent "surface-ship" characteristics, notably high freeboard and an expansive deck structure. Each was powered by two 10-cylinder, two-stroke,  MAN diesel engines (designed by the German firm that built engines that powered many German U-boats of World War I, the rights to which the U.S. Navy purchased to build domestically for their own submarines). They also had a pair of smaller  diesel-powered generators for charging batteries or augmenting the main propulsion engines on the surface. In addition to the customary torpedo tubes—four forward and two aft with 24 torpedoes (eight external)—they (and Argonaut) carried two 6-inch (152 mm)/53 caliber deck guns, the largest ever mounted on U.S. submarines.

Funded in 1926 and commissioned in 1930, V-5 and V-6 emerged as too large and unwieldy for fully successful operation: slow to dive, hard to maneuver, and easy to detect. Nonetheless, as Narwhal and Nautilus, they served usefully in the 1930s, and just before World War II Nautilus was modified to carry  of aviation gasoline for refueling seaplanes at sea. Early in the war, each was re-fitted with four  General Motors diesels and four additional external torpedo tubes (two bow and two stern), and despite their age and inherent design flaws, they went on to compile enviable war records.

Narwhal completed 15 successful war patrols and Nautilus 14, and between them, they are credited with sinking 13 enemy ships for a total of 35,000 tons. Somewhat more serendipitously, their large size made them useful for carrying both troops and cargo on covert missions. Thus, Nautilus joined with Argonaut in transporting Carlson's Raiders to Makin Atoll, and then with Narwhal, landed a strong detachment of the US Army's Alaskan Scouts on Attu in the Aleutian Islands, preparatory to the main landing that regained that island from the Japanese in May 1943. For the final two years of the war, the two boats were devoted almost exclusively to clandestine insertion and retrieval operations behind enemy lines, particularly in preparation for the U.S. campaign to retake the Philippines.

With the end of the war in sight, Narwhal and Nautilus were withdrawn from service in April and June 1945, respectively, and sold for breaking up soon thereafter. Narwhal'''s 6-inch (152 mm) guns are retained as a memorial at the Naval Submarine Base New London, Connecticut.

V-7—Dolphin
The penultimate design in the V-boat series was laid down at Portsmouth in June 1930 as V-7 and was launched as  two years later. With her name changed while she was still on the building slip, she never officially carried the name V-7 during her commissioned life. The general arrangement of propulsion machinery was identical to that of V-5 and V-6, but even with a surface displacement of only 1,718 tons, Dolphin's scaled-down main engines—rated at  each—could only just deliver the surface speed of the larger ships, and her endurance and torpedo load-out were much reduced. The torpedo armament was six 21-inch (533 mm) tubes (4 bow, 2 stern), with 18 torpedoes. A 4-inch (102 mm)/50 caliber deck gun was equipped. Dolphins size and weight were nearly ideal for the range and duration of the war patrols that became customary in the Pacific during World War II, and the war-time Gato, Balao, and Tench classes had similar dimensions. Portsmouth continued the experiments with welding that were begun on V-4, 5, and 6, and expanded it to include portions of the internal framing, tanks, and outer hull.http://pigboats.com/subs/v-boats4-0.html 

Early in the war, Dolphin made three patrols from Pearl Harbor without notable distinction, and her deteriorating material condition soon restricted her to training duties, first in Hawaii, and then at New London, Connecticut, for the duration of the war. She was decommissioned in October 1945 and sold for scrapping a year later.

V-8 and V-9—Cachalot and Cuttlefish
Even before V-5 and V-6 had been completed and V-7 laid down, submarine officer opinion had begun to shift in favor of smaller boats similar to Germany's 1,200-ton  design from World War I. Then, when the London Naval Treaty of 1930 for the first time imposed international limits on total submarine tonnage, the incentive to build smaller ships became especially compelling. The restrictions of the London Naval Treaty were a factor in the disposal in 1930 of T-1, T-2, and T-3, which had been laid up for nearly a decade. By special agreement, Argonaut, Narwhal, and Nautilus were exempted from the treaty limitations.

An extensive study was conducted to determine the optimum submarine size under the treaty restrictions, factoring in total force, endurance, and percentage of the force that could be maintained on station far from a base, as in a Pacific war scenario. The result was the two smallest V-boats, Cachalot (originally V-8) and Cuttlefish (originally V-9), funded in fiscal year 1932. At  overall and only  surface displacement, Cachalot and Cuttlefish were even smaller than the T-boats of 15 years earlier. Although the boats approached  on trials, the new MAN engines failed repeatedly from excessive vibration and were replaced in 1938 by General Motors diesels with reduction gearing. The armament was similar to Dolphin: six 21-inch (533 mm) torpedo tubes (4 bow, 2 stern), with 16 torpedoes. A 3-inch (76 mm)/50 caliber deck gun was equipped, a decrease in gun caliber that would persist through early World War II. In the 1930s it was felt that a larger gun would encourage submarine captains to fight on the surface against superior anti-submarine ships, but eventually war experience showed that a larger gun was needed.

The Navy assigned Cuttlefish to the Electric Boat Company, the first submarine contract award to a private yard since the last of the S-class in 1918. Accordingly, Cuttlefish differed from her Portsmouth-built sister, Cachalot, in many respects, including more spacious internal arrangements, and the first installation of air conditioning on a U.S. submarine. Electric Boat expanded on the use of welding with their boat, with much of the outer hull being welded, but with the internal pressure hull still riveted. Moreover, Cachalot and Cuttlefish served as the first test beds for the Mark I Torpedo Data Computer that revolutionized underwater fire control in the mid-1930s.

Unfortunately, because small size severely limited their speed, endurance, and weapons load, neither boat was successful under the conditions of the Pacific War. Each did three scoreless war patrols in the central and western Pacific, and Cachalot did one in Alaskan waters, but by late 1942, it was clear both were out-classed and worn out, and they finished the war at New London as training ships. The two were decommissioned in October 1945 and broken up several years later.

Submarines

In 1920, the Navy adopted a hull number scheme that distinguished between coastal and general purpose boats, designated "SS"; and fleet boats, designated "SF." Accordingly, T-1 through T-3 were originally designated SF-1 through SF-3, and V-1 through V-7 were designated SF-4 through SF-10. The system was changed to designate V-boats as "SC" (cruiser submarines) before V-8 and V-9 were ordered. In 1931 all received names, and all except V-4 were redesignated in the "SS" series. V-4 was also designated SM-1 at one time, as a "submarine mine-layer".

See also
 Allied submarines in the Pacific War
 Unrestricted submarine warfare
 Torpedo
 List of submarine classes of the United States Navy
 List of lost United States submarines
 List of submarines of the Second World War

Notes

References
 
 Alden, John D., The Fleet Submarine in the U.S. Navy: A Design and Construction History (Naval Institute Press, 1979), 
 Johnston, David, "No More Heads or Tails: The Adoption of Welding in U.S. Navy Submarines, The Submarine Review, June 2020, pp. 46-64
 Schlesman, Bruce and Roberts, Stephen S., "Register of Ships of the U.S. Navy, 1775–1990: Major Combatants" (Greenwood Press, 1991), 
 Lenton, H. T. American Submarines (Navies of the Second World War) (Doubleday, 1973), 
 Silverstone, Paul H., U.S. Warships of World War II (Ian Allan, 1965), 
 Campbell, John Naval Weapons of World War Two (Naval Institute Press, 1985), 
 US Feet submarine.com Fleetsubmarine.com
 Gardiner, Robert and Chesneau, Roger, Conway's All the World's Fighting Ships 1922–1946, Conway Maritime Press, 1980. .
 Friedman, Norman US Submarines through 1945: An Illustrated Design History, Naval Institute Press, Annapolis:1995, .
 Dissette, Edward, and H.C. Adamson.  (1972). Guerrilla Submarines''. Ballantine Books, New York. 
 Navsource.org fleet submarines page
 Pigboats.com V-boats page
 DiGiulian, Tony Navweaps.com later 3"/50 caliber gun
 DiGiulian, Tony Navweaps.com 4"/50 caliber gun
 DiGiulian, Tony Navweaps.com 5"/51 caliber gun
 DiGiulian, Tony Navweaps.com 6"/53 caliber gun

External links
"Battleships Ride Under The Sea", February 1931, Popular Mechanics

Submarine classes
 
World War II submarines of the United States